Eva Hagenbäumer (born 5 January 1967 in Wiesbaden, Hessen) is a former field hockey player from Germany, who was a member of the national squad that won the silver medal at the 1992 Summer Olympics in Barcelona, Spain. She competed in two consecutive Summer Olympics for her native country, starting in 1992.

References
 databaseOlympics

External links
 

1967 births
Living people
German female field hockey players
Field hockey players at the 1992 Summer Olympics
Field hockey players at the 1996 Summer Olympics
Olympic field hockey players of Germany
Olympic silver medalists for Germany
Sportspeople from Wiesbaden
Place of birth missing (living people)
Olympic medalists in field hockey
Medalists at the 1992 Summer Olympics
20th-century German women